Neşet Can Bellikli (born 9 July 1998) is an English footballer who plays as a winger for Zonguldak Kömürspor on loan from Ankara Keçiörengücü.

Career 
On 29 August 2017, Bellikli made his professional debut for AFC Wimbledon as a substitute in a 4-3 win over Barnet in the EFL Trophy. The following season, Bellikili joined Combined Counties League side Sutton Common Rovers, playing 21 matches in all competitions. He finished the season by playing for National League side Sutton United. After signing a three-year deal with Turkish side Ankara Keçiörengücü, in October 2020, Bellikli was loaned out to Zonguldak Kömürspor.

Career statistics

References

External links 
 
 
 Neşet Bellikli profile at afcwimbledon.co.uk

Living people
English footballers
AFC Wimbledon players
1998 births
Association football midfielders
Footballers from the London Borough of Sutton
Sutton United F.C. players
English people of Turkish descent
English expatriate footballers
National League (English football) players
Sutton Common Rovers F.C. players